Lieutenant Roger Hercule Gustave Degueldre (19 May 1925 – 6 July 1962) was a French officer who was the leader of the OAS Delta Commandos in the last months of French rule in Algeria.

Early life
There is some dispute about his origins but Jonathan Meades claimed that there was much 'disinformation' by the authorities to discredit him. For example there were allegations that he was a Belgian collaborator with the SS during World War II.

He was born in Louvroil, Nord, France, a few kilometres from the Belgian border, into a working-class family. His father was a railway worker. When the Germans invaded in 1940, the family fled to the south of France.

Career
In 1942 Degueldre clandestinely entered the occupied zone to join the French Resistance under Roger Pannequin and engaged the 10th German Motorized Infantry Division at Colmar in January 1945. He then joined French Foreign Legion, under the name of Roger “Legueldre” with a claimed birth on 18 September 18, 1925 in Gruyeres in Switzerland. As a foreigner he would be eligible to join the Foreign Legion. His identity was formally corrected in 1955. He reached the rank of warrant officer in Indo-China and was received the Croix de Guerre des Théâtres d'Opérations Extérieures. After the battle of Điện Biên Phủ, he transferred to the 1st Foreign Parachute Regiment and was assigned to the Algerian conflict. He was made an officer and a knight of Légion d'honneur (Legion of Honour).

While defending French Algeria in 1960, he was suspected of having taken part in a failed plot against General de Gaulle shortly after his visit in Algiers. He was transferred to the 4th Foreign Regiment. He became convinced of the need for an armed struggle and deserted to operate under cover gaining a reputation for ruthlessness. He recruited Albert Dovecar as his lieutenant along with as many as 500 others. In 1961, he established a force called the Delta Commandos of the Organisation armée secrète (OAS). On 15 March 1962 the group attacked Chateau-Royale in El-Biar close to Algiers and shot six leaders of the Educational Social Centers of Algeria (three French and three Algerian) on the grounds that the centres were believed to be directing resistance to French rule.  It is estimated that the group were responsible for 20 to 30 deaths.

Arrest and death
He was arrested on 7 April 1962, condemned to death on 28 June and executed by firing squad in the Fort d'Ivry near Paris on 7 July. Three officers appointed to command the firing squad refused and were demoted. In the event only one bullet from the 11-man firing squad hit him. The officer in charge emptied his revolver into Degueldre and had to get a second weapon to finish the execution. He is buried in the Gonards cemetery in Versailles. His partner, Nicole Gardy, was sentenced to 15 years imprisonment for her part in an escape plot but fled with her family to Argentina.

Homages and Memorials 
In November 1978, Jean-Marie Le Pen, president of the Front National, in his closing speech at the fifth congress of that movement, gave a homage to both Bastien-Thiry and Roger Degueldre. Bastien-Thiry was executed by firing-squad in 1963 for organising the attempted assassination of General de Gaulle.  

In Marignane there is a memorial to the members of the OAS terrorist organisation inaugurated on 6 July 2005, 33 years to the day after the execution of Roger Degueldre. In Nice, in the municipal Alsace-Lorraine park, there is a plaque on a monument dedicated to French Algeria, inaugurated on 25 February 1973, in the presence of Jacques Médecin, mayor of Nice, with the inscription "Roger Degueldre Symbole de l’Algérie Française".

References 

1925 births
1962 deaths
People from Nord (French department)
Members of the Organisation armée secrète
People of the Algerian War
People executed by the French Fifth Republic
French Resistance members
Executed French people
Soldiers of the French Foreign Legion
French people convicted of murdering police officers
People executed by France by firing squad
Executed people from Nord-Pas-de-Calais
People executed for murdering police officers